Steven Houghton (born 16 February 1971) is a British actor and singer. He is known for appearing in the ITV drama series London's Burning and for releasing a cover of the song "Wind Beneath My Wings", famously sung by Bette Midler in 1988.

Early life, career and family
Born in Barnsley, West Riding, Houghton trained at the Northern School of Contemporary Dance in Leeds. His first West End production was Children of Eden. Additional London credits include Cats, Hot Mikado, Martin Guerre, Blood Brothers and Spend Spend Spend, for which he was nominated for the Laurence Olivier Award. He has toured the UK in Grease, Miss Saigon and Annie Get Your Gun.

Houghton's television credits include regular roles in London's Burning, Bugs, Holby City and Bernard's Watch, a guest role in Doctors and an appearance on French National Television singing the title role in The Phantom of the Opera.

Houghton spent time in Ireland playing several roles in a film workshop for new and established directors, including Stephen Frears and Jude Kelly.

He is also patron of Footloose Stage School.

In January 2011, it was revealed he would join the cast of Coronation Street as a love interest for Sally Webster. His first appearance on screen was in February 2011 and his last on 4 November 2011.

Filmography

TV

Music career
In 1997, Houghton released his eponymous debut album for BMG/RCA, which sold 200,000 copies and earned him a gold disc. The first single from the album, a cover version of the song "Wind Beneath My Wings", reached No. 3 on the UK Singles Chart, while his rendition of Lionel Richie's 1982 song "Truly" reached #23 in 1998.
 
Houghton was also the first winner of a Stars in Their Eyes celebrity episode, impersonating Tony Hadley of Spandau Ballet and singing the hit song "Gold".

Discography

Studio albums

Singles

References

External links
 Houghton's website
 

1971 births
Living people
English male stage actors
English male musical theatre actors
English male soap opera actors
English pop singers
English male singers
People educated at Penistone Grammar School
Actors from Barnsley